A Thousand Kisses or 1000 Kisses may refer to:

 A Thousand Kisses (film) (Ik Omhels Je Met 1000 Armen), a 2006 Dutch film
 A Thousand Kisses (TV series), a 2011 South Korean TV drama
 A Thousand Kisses (radio play), a 2011 radio play by Frederic Raphael
 1000 Kisses (album), a 2002 album by Patty Griffin
 "1000 Kisses" (song), a 2002 song by Will Smith